Mary "Holly" Holladay Lamar (born 1966 in Atlanta, Georgia) is an American country music singer-songwriter. Lamar co-wrote "Breathe", a number one country and adult contemporary single by Faith Hill. Her songs have also been recorded by Sara Evans, Wynonna Judd, Lonestar, Tim McGraw, Jo Dee Messina and Jessica Simpson, among others.

In 2002, Lamar was one of the first artists signed to Universal South. Between 2002 and 2003, she had two singles on the Billboard Hot Country Singles & Tracks chart. The first, "These Are the Days", was previously recorded by Jo Dee Messina on her 2000 album Burn. Deborah Evans Price of Billboard gave Lamar's version of the song a favorable review, calling it "a solid song and a great performance that adds up to a promising debut from a new voice with a lot to say". Her second single, "Unkissed", also received a positive review from Price, who described it as "a shining calling card for a songwriter looking to make her own mark".

Personal life
Lamar appeared on the BBC daytime TV show Homes Under the Hammer, first broadcast in 2012. She bought a house at auction in the Fulham area of London.

In 2014, Lamar lost US$600,000 in a fake investment scam, which, she said, left her "on the brink of bankruptcy".

In October 2018, Lamar pleaded guilty in England to two offences relating to the illegal possession of a wild and unregistered peregrine falcon and received an 18-week sentence for each, suspended for 12 months, as well as being sentenced to 120 hours of community service. She was also banned from owning or being in possession of any birds classed as "Schedule 4" of the Wildlife and Countryside Act 1981 which are birds that must be registered and ringed if kept in captivity.

Discography

Singles

Music videos

Singles written by Lamar

References

1966 births
American women country singers
American country singer-songwriters
Living people
Musicians from Atlanta
Show Dog-Universal Music artists
Country musicians from Georgia (U.S. state)
21st-century American women
Singer-songwriters from Georgia (U.S. state)